Ants Antson (11 November 1938 – 31 October 2015) was an Estonian speed skater who competed for the Soviet Union.

Biography
Antson trained at the Kalev Voluntary Sports Society. Coached by former World, Olympic, and European Champion Boris Shilkov, Antson had his best year in 1964, when he became European Allround Champion, won the 1500 m event at the 1964 Winter Olympics in Innsbruck, and set a new world record in the 3000 m. For his achievements that year, he received the Oscar Mathisen Award.

The two gold medals Antson won in 1964 turned out to be his only international medals, although he did win some national medals at the Soviet Allround Championships – gold in 1967, silver in 1965 and 1968, and bronze in 1966. He participated in the 1500 m at the 1968 Winter Olympics in Grenoble, but despite skating a new personal record, he finished only twelfth.

He retired shortly after the 1968 Games and worked as a sports official, first in the Soviet Estonian Committee for Physical Culture and Sports, and later with the Estonian Olympic Committee. At the 1992 Winter Olympics he became the first flag bearer for Estonia after it became independent from the Soviet Union.

In 1965, Antson married Estonian film actress Eve Kivi, the couple would divorce in 1972. He later married Ene Antson and the couple remained married until his death; one week and four days before his 77th birthday.

Medals
An overview of medals won by Antson at important championships he participated in, listing the years in which he won each:

Records

World records
Over the course of his career, Antson skated one world record:

Source: SpeedSkatingStats.com

Personal records
To put these personal records in perspective, the WR column lists the official world records on the dates that Antson skated his personal records.

Source: SpeedskatingResults.com

Antson has an Adelskalender score of 176.465 points. His highest ranking on the Adelskalender was fourth place.

References

External links

 
 
 
 
Ants Antson at SpeedSkatingStats.com
Personal records from Jakub Majerski's Speedskating Database
Results of Soviet Championships at SpeedSkating.ru
Legends of Soviet Sport 

1938 births
2015 deaths
Soviet male speed skaters
Estonian male speed skaters
Olympic speed skaters of the Soviet Union
Speed skaters at the 1964 Winter Olympics
Speed skaters at the 1968 Winter Olympics
World record setters in speed skating
Olympic gold medalists for the Soviet Union
Sportspeople from Tallinn
Olympic medalists in speed skating
Medalists at the 1964 Winter Olympics